Behind Enemy Lines is a 2002 autobiographical book co-written by Holocaust survivor Marthe Cohn and Wendy Holden. It details Cohn's exploits as a French Jew during the Holocaust and World War II when, working as a nurse, she traveled into German territory to collect intelligence for the French Army, as the Allied forces started making advances on Germany, pushing the German forces back during World War II

References 

Personal accounts of the Holocaust
2002 non-fiction books